Parasalvazaon apicicorne is a species of beetle in the family Cerambycidae, and the only species in the genus Parasalvazaon. It was described by Breuning in 1958.

References

Desmiphorini
Beetles described in 1958
Monotypic beetle genera